Michigan Stove Company was originally an enterprise started by Jeremiah Dwyer and his brother in the mid nineteenth century. Their career background training was in the foundry business. They started a Detroit, Michigan company that eventually developed into a joint stock company called the Detroit Stove Works. Dwyer reorganized this firm in 1871 with another set of investors and it became the Michigan Stove Company. They manufactured cooking stoves, heaters, and furnaces under their "Garland" brand. The company was known for its state of the art technology in foundry applications. It was considered to be the world's largest producer of stoves and ranges with its 700 styles and sizes. The company had branch offices in the largest U.S. cities, as well as global distribution arrangements.

History 

The history of the foundation of the Michigan Stove Company starts before the American Civil War, when Americans cooked and heated their homes with an open hearth. This old technology was inefficient, costly, and dangerous. A few modern stoves for the elite and wealthy started to appear in Detroit in the 1830s. All stoves from the 1840s to the 1860s were made and shipped from New York City via the Erie Canal and the Great Lakes. The creator of the company was Jeremiah Dwyer. He had apprenticed and worked for several years in New York to learn the stove business. In 1861, he and his younger brother James bought out a failing Detroit reaper manufacturer that was trying to make stoves. They brought in Thomas W. Misner as a partner and their new firm became J. Dwyer & Company. There was a large demand for cooking and heating stoves at the time and the Dwyers brothers became successful due to their stove-making skills. They were the first foundry operators in the midwestern United States to use modern engineering foundry techniques to make stoves.

The first stoves made by the J. Dwyer & Company were sold to local residents through personal solicitation. In 1863, Misner sold his equity in the firm to William H. Tefft and Merrill I. Mills. J. Dwyer & Company incorporated as a stock company in 1864 and became the Detroit Stove Works. This company's founders were Jeremiah Dwyer, James Dwyer, Merrill I. Mills, Edwin S. Barbour, and William H. Tefft. Dwyer bought pig iron and other similar materials from merchant Charles DuCharme to make his stoves.  DuCharme, a wealthy Detroit businessman with many establishments, became an investor in Dwyer's firm. The company made a variety of cooking and heating stoves, which it marketed under their "Jewel" brand, and at its peak employed a thousand workers.

Jeremiah Dwyer was a compulsive worker and expanded the facilities at the Detroit Stove Works. Because of his exposure to the foundry's polluted air, he contracted a pulmonary disease and was compelled to leave the foundry business for a while in 1869. Dwyer sold his ownership in the company to his brother and Edwin S Barbour, and went to live in the southern United States. He later returned to Detroit after his health recovered and again became active in the foundry business. Then in the autumn of 1871 he started a new firm with a group of investors and incorporated it as the Michigan Stove Company.

The partners in the Michigan Stove Company were Jeremiah Dwyer, Charles DuCharme, Francis Palms, Richard Long Sr., Merrill I. Mills, and George Harrison Barbour. DuCharme became the president, Dwyer its vice president and general manager, Mills its treasurer, and Barbour its secretary. The company began manufacturing stoves, heaters, and furnaces on September 12, 1872. They first made "Argand" brand stove and paid a royalty to Perry & Company of Albany, New York, for the rights to make their style and brand. Michigan Stove Company discontinued making "Argand" stoves and started making its own style of stoves, which were branded "Garland", in 1876. This name was chosen because Dwyer didn't want to lose the customers who were loyal to the "Argand" brand stoves so he chose a similar-sounding name for the company's new brand.

There was a major fire at the Michigan Stove Company on January 8, 1907. It started in the evening and within a few hours had destroyed the manufacturing plant. The damage was estimated at $500,000, of which $400,000 was covered by insurance. The 2,200 men working at the factory became unemployed. The fire was first noticed at the coal-hopper in the engine room by the night watchman. It soon spread to the center of the building. 

The fire department arrived within fifteen minutes of being notified but it was out of control by the time firefighters began hosing down the building. The oversized replica stove being displayed adjacent to the factory was damaged as one of the plant's six-story walls fell on it. The factory's inventory of 20,000 stoves were destroyed. Thousands of Detroit residents watched the fire and the crowd had to be controlled by police. One unidentified man was taken away from the debris by ambulance to St. Mary's hospital and later died.

Jeremiah Dwyer had become president of Michigan Stove Company later in the year. It was the largest of Detroit's six stove manufacturers at the time. By 1922, the company produced over 150,000 stoves, ranges, and furnaces annually. The factory covered . It had over a thousand employees and the value of its yearly production was about three-and-a-half million dollars. The company had few labor disputes because of Dwyer's diplomacy; during his presidency he would personally see them at his private office or their shop to resolve work issues. Most problems were settled amicably and the company became a union shop.

The Michigan Stove Company, which was headquartered on Jefferson Avenue in Detroit, made over 700 styles and sizes of cooking and heating stoves, all of which were branded "Garland". The company had an annual advertising budget of between $65,000 and $100,000, and claimed to be the largest manufacturer of stoves and ranges in the world. They made steels using aluminum and other metals, which were mixed with iron. The company hired metallurgist William J. Keep to develop these steels; he was the first-such metallurgist to be associated with a foundry in Michigan. The company employed around fifteen hundred workers at any one time and manufactured 60,000 to 70,000 stoves and heaters a year. The company's manufacturing buildings covered ; and sold its products in Michigan, Ohio, and Indiana at the beginning. Within twenty years, they were sold throughout the United States. 

In 1923, Michigan Stove Company took over the Art Stove works. In 1925, it merged with Detroit Stove works, becoming Detroit-Michigan Stove Company, which, in 1945, took over A-B Stoves of Battle Creek, Michigan. The company started making automobile parts and by 1948, it was showing nearly a 10% profit on $21 million in sales. A year later, however, sales were half as much and profits declined annually from then on. The Garland brand name was purchased by the Welbilt Corporation in 1955 when the Detroit-Michigan Stove Company began to fail and its plant was officially closed in 1957. Garland Commercial Industries was formed in 1973. The Garland brand is now used for traditional kitchen stoves and commercial equipment for restaurants and hotels, including grills, fryers, bakery ovens, and pizza ovens.

Products 

The title page usually showed reproductions of medals won by the company and the catalog contained sketches of the manufacturing works at Detroit and the regional headquarters office in Chicago.

Michigan Stove Company's Oak Garland "J" series heater was intended for burning natural gas, coal, coke, and wood. The company claimed any fuel could be used without modifications to the heater's body. When it burned natural gas, a ring of orifices was placed above the ash pit—a feature unique to this model. The placement of the gas-burning ring then required no modifications in the firebox construction so it could burn coal, coke, and wood as was originally intended for the main unit. The gas ring construction provided efficient heating; it extracted most of the heat because the gas was superheated before being ignited. This heater was constructed with smooth, cold-formed steel and a cast-iron body.

Offices, branches, and distributors 

Michigan Stove Company had branch offices in Chicago, New York City, and Buffalo, New York. It had agents in Honolulu, London, Paris, Berlin, Constantinople, Manila, and the Philippine Islands.

See also 
William J. Keep
World's Largest Stove

References

Sources 

 

 

 

 

 

 

 

 

 

 

 

 

 

 

 

 

 

 

 

Science and technology in Michigan
Economy of Michigan
Defunct organizations based in Michigan